Louisiana Christian University was established in 1906 by the Louisiana Baptist Convention in Pineville, Louisiana

List of presidents 

1906-1909 - Edwin O. Ware, Sr., founding president, grandfather of former Rapides Parish District Attorney Edwin O. Ware, III
1909-1910 - W. C. Friley
1910-1941 - Claybrook C. Cottingham, resigned to accept presidency of Louisiana Tech University in Ruston
1941 interim - Hal Monroe Weathersby, the LC dean, served as acting president for several months.
1941-1951 - Edgar Godbold
1951-1975 - G. Earl Guinn
1975-1997 - Robert L. Lynn
1997-2004 - Rory Lee
2004 interim - John "Bud" Traylor, a Baptist minister and school trustee, served as acting president for several months.
2005-2014 - Joe W. Aguillard
2014-2015      - Argile Smith (interim)
2015-      -Rick Brewer (academic)

References

Louisiana Christian University
Louisiana Christian University
Presidents of Louisiana Christian University